A splinter (also known as a sliver) is a fragment of a larger object, or a foreign body that penetrates or is purposely injected into a body. The foreign body must be lodged inside tissue to be considered a splinter. Splinters may cause initial pain through ripping of flesh and muscle, or infection through bacteria on the foreign object.
 
Splinters commonly consist of wood, but there are many other types, for example, other common types of splinters are glass, plastic, metal, and spines of animals.

As with any wound that breaks the skin, splinters can lead to infection, which if left untreated could develop into more serious complications. If a splinter is in the body for more than 2–3 days, or if the wound shows signs of inflammation or tenderness (whether the splinter was removed or not), advice should be sought from a doctor.

Getting a splinter
Generally, a splinter causes an initial feeling of pain as the sharp object makes its initial penetration through the body. Through this penetration, the object cuts through the cutaneous layer of the skin, and settles in the subcutaneous layer of the skin, and can even penetrate further down, breaking the sub-cutaneous layer, settling in muscle tissue, or even the bone. Some splinters will remain in place, but most will continue to migrate through the body, further damaging their surroundings.

Types

According to the American Academy of Family Physicians, the most common foreign bodies contracted by people fall into two official classes: biological splinters, and nonbiological splinters. In the biological class, splinters include bone, fish spines, teeth, and wood. In the nonbiological class, common splinters contracted are glass, metal, aluminum, fishhooks, pencil graphite, and plastic.

Rarely, people may become infected with splinters from more unusual sources. Common cases of exotic foreign bodies include sea urchins, insect stings, stingray spines, and even grenade shrapnel.

Specific details of some splinters
 Wood: this type of splinter is contracted from lumber or other vegetative materials. Wood splinters must be removed from wounds because they are associated with inflammation and risk of infection. Larger or deeper splinters can result in difficult removal, or localization of the foreign body.
 Fishhooks: fishhooks that become lodged in the skin are problematic because of the barbs found on the ends of most fishhooks. These barbs are designed to make removal difficult, and if care is not taken, the victim can experience tearing of not only the flesh, but the muscle as well. The most common injuries caused by fishhooks occur in the hand, face, scalp, foot, and eye.
 Glass: One study found that patients were more likely to feel sensations from glass present in their skin than from any other kind of splinter. Though glass is generally detectable by radiography and is radiopaque, there is limited ability for radiography to detect glass fragments smaller than 2mm. Most glass splinters are inert, and generally lack the ability to migrate to other regions of the body.
 Other: Pencil lead and other graphite foreign bodies, once lodged in the cutaneous layer of the skin, can cause permanent pigment tattooing if not removed immediately. Metallic bodies range from BB pellets to grenade shrapnel. Smaller objects can be removed without much difficulty if the depth of the wound remains superficial, but if the wound does not protrude past the subcutaneous layers of the skin, and remains inert, the object can actually remain in place. In larger objects, fragments that remain superficial in one's body may be removed without much trouble, but if wounds protrude past the subcutaneous layers of the skin and even into the muscular area or near vital organs, such objects must be left alone and immediate medical attention must be sought.
 Hair: Short lengths of hair, especially stiff hair such as trimmed beard hair or pet hair, can work its way under the skin of the feet or hands. So-called hair splinters are commonly experienced by hairdressers and dog groomers. This is distinct from an ingrown hair, where a hair still attached to its follicle grows back under (or fails to emerge from) the skin.  Furthermore, unlike an ingrown hair, the hair that is embedded by a hair splinter may not be one's own; the hair may have either belonged to another person or to an animal.

Detection

Splinters are often first detected by the person with the splinter in their body. There are many signs that a splinter has entered one's body.

Signs of a hidden foreign body
 Puncture wound
 Blood-stained injury track of a fresh wound
 Sharp pain with deep palpation over a puncture wound
 Discoloration beneath the epidermis
 Wound that elicits pain with movement
 Wound that fails to heal
 Abscess (with sterile culture)
 Pain associated with a mass
 Mass under the epidermis
 Chronically draining purulent wound
 Cyst
 Granuloma formation
 Sterile monoarticular arthritis
 Periosteal reactions
 Osteomyelitis
 Pseudotumors of bone
 Delayed tendon or nerve injury

Imaging

If manual detection and localization fail, the main methods for medical imaging of splinters are:
 Projectional radiography – used to locate bone, fish spines, glass, gravel-stone, metal, aluminum, pencil graphite, some plastics, teeth, and some wood (e.g., spines, cactus, thorns)
 Medical ultrasonography – used to locate glass, metal, pencil graphite, some plastics, stone, and some types of wood.

Small wooden splinters (1–4 mm) distant from bones are most easily detected by ultrasonography, while CT scan and magnetic resonance imaging have higher sensitivity for those near bones.

Removal
There are many medical techniques to remove splinters safely. Common medical techniques include the Elliptical Technique and the String Technique. In the elliptical technique the surrounding area of the splinter is sliced in an elliptical formation. From there the flesh in the elliptical area is cut (in the shape of an upside-down cone) and the whole chunk of flesh containing the splinter is removed. The Needle Cover Technique is limited to fishhook removal. A string is looped around the base of the hook, and as the hook is pressed further into the skin, the string is pulled, allowing the barbs to be unhooked from muscle and follow the path of the rest of the hook out of the body without snagging any additional flesh.

Since the splinter has penetrated through a physical barrier of the body it allows for an individual to get an infection. The opening from the splinter will make it easier for bacteria to get into the body. It is strongly encouraged for the removal of a splinter before falling victim to an infection.

Infection 
Infection is usually determined by the duration of time that the foreign object remains lodged in the human body. Objects that have included poison, deep penetration, dirt, or bite injuries generally result in a shorter time until infection is notable.  According to the AAFP, patients that are older, or have diabetes, or have wounds that are longer, wider, more jagged or deeper, have a much higher risk of infection. Simply the easiest way to avoid infection is to completely remove the splinters or foreign body as soon as possible. 
Though infection is generally the largest complication encountered with splinters, ranging from 1.1 to 12 percent presence, the use of antibiotics in non-bite cases is generally deemed unnecessary by the medical community. Though cases are rare, infection of foreign body wounds can result in cases of tetanus.

One case of tetanus contraction through a splinter was seen in Ohio in 1993. An 80-year-old woman was presented to an ED with dysphagia and a stiff jaw.  Not long after a preliminary checkup, a wood splinter was found to have been lodged in her chin for approximately 1 week; the area was erythematous with active purulent drainage. The woman was diagnosed with tetanus, admitted to the hospital, and begun on a regimen of 3,000 units of tetanus immune globulin, tetanus toxoid, and intravenous clindamycin. Despite aggressive treatment, including assisted mechanical ventilation, the patient died 15 days later from the effects of her primary infection. The woman had no history of previous tetanus vaccinations despite previous care for a wound and ongoing medical attention for hypertension.

Since most splinters are made of organic matter, they are much more dangerous than other types of things puncturing the body. Splinters are usually infected with many bacteria which then turn into an infection such as tetanus. Due to a splinter being made of organic matter, it makes it much more difficult for the body to get rid of it.

References

Injuries